Paul Skousen is a son of W. Cleon Skousen, and is a writer of books including The Naked Socialist. He has written other books aimed at the Latter Day Saint market.

Skousen studied at Brigham Young University in communications and journalism, and at Georgetown University in national security studies. He worked as a military analyst, trainer, and watch officer for the Central Intelligence Agency, and as an intelligence officer for two years in the White House Situation Room during the Reagan Administration. He and his wife, the former Kathy Bradshaw, are the parents of ten children.

In December 2009 Skousen was involved in a discussion at BYU in which he defended the political ideas of his father. In July 2013 Skousen was interviewed on BookTV regarding The Naked Socialist.

Works

 The Federalist Papers Made Easier -- The Complete and Original Text Subdivided and Annotated for Easier Understanding (2022, nonfiction, understanding The Federalist)   
 How to Save the Constitution -- Restoring the Principles of Liberty (2019, nonfiction, an approach to restore Constitution)   
 How to Read the Constitution and the Declaration of Independence (2016, nonfiction, brief introduction to America's founding documents) 
 The Constitution and the Declaration of Independence -- By the Founding Fathers & Paul B Skousen (2016, nonfiction, brief introduction to America's founding documents) 
 The Naked Socialist (2012, nonfiction, the story of socialism from its ancient roots to modern times) 
 Bassam and the Seven Secret Scrolls (2014, historical novel, the camel caravan becomes a nation in miniature, teaching the 7 ideas of prosperity and principles of freedom) 
 Zafir and the Seventh Scroll (2016, historical novel, continuation of Bassam series) 
 The Search for Rasha (2018, historical novel, conclusion of Bassam series)  
 Comrade Paul's Socialist Bathroom Reader (2012, nonfiction, facts, tidbits and humor from socialist nations about socialism/communism) 
 Treasures from the Journal of Discourses (2012, nonfiction, highlights excerpted from the Journal of Discourses) 
 The Skousen Book of More Amazing Mormon World Records (2008, nonfiction, a follow-on to the first records book) 
 Brother Paul's Mormon Bathroom Reader (2005, nonfiction, anecdotes, history, facts about Mormon (LDS) culture)  
 The Skousen Book of Mormon World Records (2004, nonfiction, historical anecdotes about Mormons (LDS) and their individual or membership-wide achievements)

Sources

Further reading

External links
bio from Skousen's website
Cedar Fort author bio

American Latter Day Saints
Brigham Young University alumni
Walsh School of Foreign Service alumni
Living people
Year of birth missing (living people)